James Jackson (September 21, 1757 – March 19, 1806) was an early British-born Georgia politician of the Democratic-Republican Party. He was a member of the U.S. House of Representatives from 1789 until 1791. He was also a U.S. Senator from Georgia from 1793 to 1795, and from 1801 until his death in 1806.  In 1797 he was elected 23rd Governor of Georgia, serving from 1798 to 1801 before returning to the senate.

Early life
Jackson was born in Moretonhampstead, Devonshire, England. He immigrated at age 15 to Savannah, Georgia in 1772, and it was then that he became a ward of Savannah lawyer, John Wereat. As a young man, Jackson became well known as a duelist with a fiery temper; in February 1780 he killed Georgia governor George Wells in a duel. In 1785, he married Mary Charlotte Young, with whom he had five sons, four of whom later became prominent in the state's public affairs. He owned slaves.

Revolutionary War
During the American Revolutionary War, he served in the 1st Brigade Georgia Militia at the defense of Savannah, the Battle of Cowpens, and the recapture of Augusta and Savannah.

When the British left Savannah in July 1782, General Anthony Wayne gave Jackson the privilege of receiving the keys to the city. Even after the Revolutionary War, Jackson remained an important and influential figure in the Georgia Militia; he participated in the expansionist drive against the Creek Nation in Georgia. Jackson eventually thus rose to the rank of brigadier general of Georgia's militia in 1786 and major general in 1792.

Political career
After the war, he built up his law practice in Savannah. Jackson was elected to the first Georgia state legislature in 1777 after he had been clerk of court in the Provincial Congress. His interest in the military was rekindled when he joined the Georgia militia in the defense of Georgia frontier settlers against Indian inhabitants. In 1788, Jackson was elected governor of Georgia but declined the position, citing his inexperience.

In 1789, Jackson was elected to the First United States Congress. Prior to his election, though, Jackson had to fight an uphill battle in one of Georgia's most contentious districts. The First District was the least populated district in the state, and the three-fifths ratio in counting slaves, the district was considered to have a population of over 16,000 individuals. The district in which Jackson ran for Congress was one of the most contested in the state. During the election, Jackson had to campaign against two popular people who had all served in Congress, William Houston and Henry Osborne.  Jackson won the seat for the first district by a narrow margin, and the result was unsuccessfully challenged by Osborne. As a Jeffersonian Republican, he vigorously opposed Secretary of the Treasury Alexander Hamilton's financial plans for federal assumption of the states' debts from the Revolutionary War. Jackson opposed many of Hamilton’s plans on how to relieve the states of their debts from the Revolutionary War.  One of the first plans that Hamilton proposed was that of placing a tax on spirits. The proposition received a resounding rebuttal from Jackson who said that it would "deprive the mass of the people of almost the only luxury they enjoy, that of distilled spirits."

It was originally suggested that the tax would be $0.15 per gallon tax, but Jackson countered that with a $0.12 per gallon tax. Jackson’s suggestion was denied so the bill was passed with the $0.15 per gallon tax on distilled spirits.

The next bill that Jackson and Hamilton fought over was the assumption of states’ debts from the war. Hamilton wanted to lump all of the states' debts from the Revolutionary War into one national debt in which the states all worked together to pay off the debt. Jackson strongly believed that states like Georgia that accumulated little debt during the war should not have to work to pay off other states' debts by paying more taxes. He was also strongly opposed to efforts to curtail slavery. He warned that ending slavery would "(...) light up the flame of civil discord for the people of the Southern States (...) they will never suffer themselves to be divested of their property without a struggle.”

While serving as a member of the House of Representatives, Jackson was a very active member; he served on over 20 committees and reported on many more. It was during his first term that Jackson became known for his fiery temper and personality; there was a point when he became so impassioned over the topic at hand that the senators who were meeting above the House chambers had to close the windows so as to muffle Jackson's voice.

Defeated for re-election in 1791 by his former Revolutionary commander, Anthony Wayne (for whom Wayne County is named), in a campaign rife with charges of irregularities on the part of Wayne's supporters, Jackson contested the outcome. He was convinced that Wayne had not won his seat fairly so he mounted a campaign against Wayne and his supporters, and finally succeeded in removing Wayne from Congress. Making effective use of grand jury presentments and newspapers, Jackson secured a seat in the legislature and subsequently oversaw the ouster of Wayne's campaign manager from his state judgeship. Jackson then took his struggle for vindication to Congress, where he convinced the House that Wayne had not won fairly. He failed to regain his seat after the tie-breaking vote of the Federalist Speaker.

Meanwhile, the state of Georgia sold millions of acres of its western lands, called the Yazoo region, at extremely low prices to a group of investors. Jackson, believing that the sale was influenced by bribery of state legislatures, resigned his post in the Senate to run for a seat in the Georgia legislature in 1795. He won the election and began to lead a campaign to repeal the Yazoo land sale. In 1798, he won the election for governor of Georgia and proceeded to implement the legislation repealing the Yazoo land sale. Jackson placed blame for the Yazoo land fraud on his political enemies, including James Gunn and the Federalists. He built the Georgia Democratic-Republican party and led it to statewide dominance.

He was a presidential elector in the 1796 presidential election.

Jackson was re-elected to the Senate in 1801 and served until his death in 1806.

Legacy
He is buried in the Congressional Cemetery, a National Historic Landmark in Washington, DC.

Jackson was the patriarch of a political dynasty in Georgia. His son, Jabez Young Jackson, was a representative from Georgia in the Twenty-fourth and Twenty-fifth United States Congress.

His grandson, also named James Jackson, was a U.S. Representative from Georgia, a judge advocate on the staff of General Thomas "Stonewall" Jackson and a trustee of the University of Georgia.

Jackson is the namesake of Jackson County, Georgia, Jackson, Georgia, James Jackson Parkway Northwest in Atlanta. Fort James Jackson, which protected the city of Savannah from attack by sea during most of the nineteenth century, is today a museum and restored garrison. The ghost town of Jacksonboro, Georgia is also named for Jackson.

See also

 List of U.S. state governors born outside the United States
 List of United States senators born outside the United States
 List of United States Congress members who died in office (1790–1899)

References
Jackson, James. Documents. E. Merton Coulter manuscript collection II. MS 2345. Hargrett Rare Book and Manuscript Library, University of Georgia Libraries. From America's Turning Point: Documenting the Civil War Experience in Georgia. Web. Retrieved 21 May 2016.
Jackson, James. Papers of James Jackson, 1781-1798. From Collections of the Georgia Historical Society, Georgia Historical Society, 1955, Georgia Historical Society. Web. Retrieved 21 May 2016.

External links

1757 births
1806 deaths
People from Moretonhampstead
British emigrants to the Thirteen Colonies
American people of English descent
American Congregationalists
Anti-Administration Party members of the United States House of Representatives from Georgia (U.S. state)
Anti-Administration Party United States senators from Georgia (U.S. state)
Democratic-Republican Party United States senators from Georgia (U.S. state)
Democratic-Republican Party state governors of the United States
Governors of Georgia (U.S. state)
Georgia (U.S. state) lawyers
American slave owners
Politicians from Savannah, Georgia
People from Jackson County, Georgia
18th-century American lawyers
19th-century American politicians
Georgia (U.S. state) militiamen in the American Revolution
People of Georgia (U.S. state) in the American Revolution
Burials at the Congressional Cemetery
1796 United States presidential electors
United States senators who owned slaves